Baker Lake (Inuktitut syllabics: ᖃᒪᓂᑦᑐᐊᖅ 'big lake joined by a river at both ends', Inuktitut: Qamani'tuaq 'where the river widens') is a hamlet in the Kivalliq Region, in Nunavut on mainland Canada. The hamlet is located at the mouth of the Thelon River on the shore of Baker Lake. The community was given its English name in 1761 from Captain William Christopher who named it after Sir William Baker, the 11th Governor of the Hudson's Bay Company.

History 
In 1916, the Hudson's Bay Company established a trading post at Baker Lake, followed by Anglican missionaries in 1927. The Royal Canadian Mounted Police had been in the area for fifteen years before establishing a post at Baker Lake in 1930. In 1946 the population was 32, of which 25 were Inuit. A small hospital was built in 1957, followed by a regional school the next year.

In 1979 the Baker Lake Hunters and Trappers Association and the Inuit Tapirisat of Canada (ITK) took the Canadian federal government to court for giving exploration licenses to mining companies in areas where the Inuit hunt caribou. Judge Mahoney of the Federal Court of Canada, in Hamlet of Baker Lake v. Minister of Indian Affairs, recognized the existence of Aboriginal Title in Nunavut.The plaintiffs were concerned that "government-licensed exploration companies were interfering with their aboriginal rights, specifically, their right to hunt caribou."

Videos of elders sharing oral histories have been collected by Inuit students as part of the Nunavut Teacher Education Program.

Demographics 

Baker Lake is home to eleven Inuit groups:
 Ahiarmiut/Ihalmiut, originally from the north of Back River area, and from Ennadai Lake
 Akilinirmiut, originally from the Akiliniq Hills, Thelon River area of Beverly Lake, Dubawnt Lake, Aberdeen Lake
 Hanningajurmiut, originally from Garry Lake
 Harvaqtuurmiut, originally from the Kazan River area
 Hauniqturmiut, originally from Whale Cove's south, between Sandy Point and Arviat
 Iluilirmiut / Illuilirmiut, originally from Adelaide Peninsula (Iluilik), Chantrey Inlet area
 Kihlirnirmiut, originally from the Garry Lake area between Bathurst Inlet, Cambridge Bay
 Natsilingmiut, originally from Baker Lake area between Gjoa Haven, Taloyoak, Kugaaruk, Repulse Bay
 Padlermiut, originally from the Baker Lake to Arviat area
 Qaernermiut, originally from the lower Thelon River, Baker Lake, Chesterfield Inlet, Corbett Inlet areas, between Rankin Inlet and Whale Cove
 Utkuhiksalingmiut, originally from the Back River and Gjoa Haven/Wager Bay area

Economy 
Many of the town's residents work in the Meadowbank gold mine for Agnico Eagle Mines Limited. Much of the local infrastructure and logistics-related employment is based around aiding mineral exploration and mining efforts in the wider area. The construction of the mine employed over 1,000 workers, over 30% of them were locals from the general area of the Kivalliq Region. Along with employing local people, the company helped build cellphone towers to get the community connected to Northwestel's cellphone service. The coming of workers from all across Canada also helped developing tourism in this community. There is also potential for a uranium mine, called the Kiggavik Project, which is being proposed by AREVA Resources Canada.

Geography

Climate 

Baker Lake features a subarctic climate (Köppen climate classification: Dfc) with short, cool summers and long, cold winters. In contrast to Fairbanks, Alaska on a similar parallel, May is a subfreezing month and June is chilly considering the long hours of daylight.

Wildlife 
Baker Lake is host to a variety of wildlife including caribou, muskox, Arctic hares and wolves, wolverines, sik-siks, geese and lake trout among others.

Arts and culture 
Baker Lake is known for its Inuit art, such as wall hangings, basalt stone sculptures and stone cut prints. The community has been home to internationally exhibited artists such as Matthew Agigaaq, Elizabeth Angrnaqquaq, Luke Anguhadluq, Barnabus Arnasungaaq, David Ikutaq, Toona Iquliq, Janet Nungnik, Jessie Oonark, Ruth Qaulluaryuk, Irene Avaalaaqiaq Tiktaalaaq, Simon Tookoome, Marion Tuu'luq, and Marie Kuunnuaq.

The Jessie Oonark Arts and Crafts Centre, which opened in 1992, is a work area for the communities artists. It provides space for carving, print making, sewing and jewellery making. It is also home to Jessie Oonark Crafts Ltd. a subsidiary of the Nunavut Development Corporation, a Government of Nunavut crown corporation.

Infrastructure

Transportation 
The settlement is served by Baker Lake Airport, linking it to the nearby coastal town of Rankin Inlet, about 35 minutes away by air. Calm Air serves the town with at least two flights daily. Every day there are connecting flights to Winnipeg.

While the local road network does not connect to another community, there is an approximately  all weather gravel highway named Mine Road. It runs north, from the town to the Meadowbank Gold Mine and aerodrome. It was proposed and completed around 2019 and is among the longest highways in Nunavut. An  road runs east from the townsite to the Geographic Centre of Canada monument.

Broadband communications 
The community has been served by the Qiniq network since 2005. Qiniq is a fixed wireless service to homes and businesses, connecting to the outside world via a satellite backbone. The Qiniq network is designed and operated by SSi Canada. In 2017, the network was upgraded to 4G LTE technology, and 2G-GSM for mobile voice.

Services 
Baker Lake has a woman's shelter, health centre (Baker Lake Health Centre), dental clinic, heritage centre, visitor's centre, counselling centre, elders' centre, three hotels (Baker Lake Lodge, Iglu Hotel and Nunamiut Lodge), swimming pool, library, primary and secondary school (Rachel Arngnammaktiq Elementary School and Jonah Amitnaaq Secondary School), and youth centre.

There are three churches in the community, Anglican (St. Aidan's), Catholic (St. Paul's) and Glad Tidings.

See also 

 List of municipalities in Nunavut
 David Simailak
 Baker Lake Water Aerodrome
 Inuujarvik Territorial Park
 Glenn McLean
 William Noah
 Cosmos 954
North-West Mounted Police in the Canadian north

References

Further reading 

 Baker Lake Residents' Association, and Mary McCulloch. Baker Lake, N.W.T., 1870–1970. Baker Lake, N.W.T.: Baker Lake Residents' Association, 1971.
 Kardosh, Judy. Works on Cloth Imagery by Artists of Baker Lake, Nunavut. Vancouver: Marion Scott Gallery, 2002. 
 Klassen, R. A. Drift composition and glacial dispersal trains, Baker Lake area, District of Keewatin, northwest territories. Ottawa: Geological Survey of Canada, 1995. 
 Krebs, Charles J. The Lemming Cycle at Baker Lake, Northwest Territories, During 1959–62. 1964.
 Miller, A. R. Uranium Geology of the Eastern Baker Lake Basin, District of Keewatin, Northwest Territories. [Ottawa]: Energy, Mines, and Resources Canada, 1980. 
 Renewable Resources Consulting Services. Study of the Effects of Resource Exploration and Development on Hunting and Trapping on the Traditional Economy of the Inuit in the Baker Lake Area. Edmonton: Renewable Resources Consulting Services, 1977.

External links 

 Baker Lake Official Website

Hudson's Bay Company trading posts in Nunavut
Hamlets in the Kivalliq Region
Road-inaccessible communities of Nunavut